Mirel Josa (born 1 June 1963) is an Albanian former football player and current coach of Vllaznia in the Kategoria Superiore. As a player, he played in the Greek Alpha Ethniki for Nea Kavala and Aris, as well as making 27 international appearances for the Albania national football team between 1984 and 1992.

Playing career

Club
Josa started his club career with his boyhood club 17 Nëntori where he would play for ten years, winning three league titles alongside fellow internationals and Albanian legends Arbën Minga, Shkëlqim Muça and Agustin Kola. He will be long remembered by the fans for his last-minute goal against the Romanian side Dinamo București in the 1986–87 edition of European Cup Winners' Cup, which brought his team in the best 16 of the competition, where they got eliminated by Malmö.

Later, Josa left the country for the first time and moved abroad, signing a one-year contract with Greek side Aris. He played only one season with the club, then moved to AO Kavala. He ended his playing career with Greek lower league side ILTEX Lykoi, Alexandroupoli and Neapoli.

International
In his youth years Josa distinguished himself both as a defensive and attacking midfielder. During the 1982 UEFA European Under-18 Championship, played in Finland, Josa managed to score a goal against Netherlands, in a 1–3 loss, which disqualified Netherlands, where Marco van Basten was present.

During the 1984 UEFA European Under-21 Football Championship his goal made Albania draw against West Germany in Trier, and was a determining factor in qualifying Albania in the quarter-finals of the championship, eliminating West Germany, Turkey, and Austria. After that game Josa was awarded the Master of Sports title.

He made his senior debut for Albania in an October 1984 FIFA World Cup qualification match away at Belgium and earned a total of 27 caps, scoring 1 goal. In the national team during the qualifiers of Mexico 1986 campaign he scored the first goal in the famous December 1984 home win over Belgium. His final international was an April 1992 FIFA World Cup qualification match against Spain.

Managerial career

Vllaznia
On 26 October 2010, Josa become the new coach of Vllaznia, replacing the Montenegrin coach Mojas Radonjić who was sacked following a run of negative results. He returned for the first time in the club since 2008. He was presented to the media in the very same day.

Skënderbeu
On 4 August 2012, Josa was unveiled as the new coach of Skënderbeu ahead of 2012–13 season.

On 18 May 2016, after winning the club's six consecutive league title and his fourth personal, Josa become the most successful coach in the history of Albanian football.

Tirana
Josa was appointed the new coach of Tirana on 2 November 2016 only a day following the sacking of Ilir Daja. It was his second return to Tirana, the first since 2006. During the presentation, club president Refik Halili stated that he sacrificed Daja for the returning of Josa. On 27 May 2017, Tirana suffered relegation for the first time in history after not going more than a goalless in the last matchday against Vllaznia in Shkodër, which saw the club finish the season in 9th place which relegated them. Four days later, Tirana won the Albanian Cup for the 16th in history, beating Skënderbeu 3–1 in the final. On 15 June, Josa left the club after terminating the contract by mutual consent.

Personal life
Josa is the son-in-law of Shyqyri Rreli, former Albania coach.

Honours

Player
Tirana
 Albanian National Championship (4): 1981–82, 1984–85, 1987–88, 1988–89
 Albanian Cup (3): 1982–83, 1983–84, 1985–86

Manager
Tirana
 Kategoria Superiore (1): 2003–04
 Albanian Cup (1): 2016–17

Skënderbeu
 Kategoria Superiore (4): 2012–13, 2013–14, 2014–15, 2015–16
 Albanian Supercup (2): 2013, 2014

Prishtina
 Kosovar Cup (1): 2017–18

Vllaznia
 Albanian Cup (1): 2021–22

References

External links

1963 births
Living people
Footballers from Tirana
Albanian footballers
Association football midfielders
Albania international footballers
KF Tirana players
Aris Thessaloniki F.C. players
Kavala F.C. players
Albanian expatriate footballers
Expatriate footballers in Greece
Albanian expatriate sportspeople in Greece
Albanian football managers
KF Tirana managers
KS Lushnja managers
KF Skënderbeu Korçë managers
KF Vllaznia Shkodër managers
KF Elbasani managers
KF Teuta Durrës managers
Shkumbini Peqin managers
FK Kukësi managers
FC Prishtina managers
Kategoria Superiore managers
Albanian expatriate football managers
Expatriate football managers in Kosovo
Albanian expatriate sportspeople in Kosovo